Liparis bautingensis is a species of plant in the family Orchidaceae. It is endemic to the Hainan region of southern China.

Liparis bautingensis is listed as an endangered species.

References 

bautingensis
Endemic orchids of China
Flora of Hainan
Plants described in 1974
Endangered plants
Threatened flora of Asia
Taxonomy articles created by Polbot